Gymnopilus lepidotus is a species of mushroom-forming fungus in the family Hymenogastraceae.

Description

Habitat and distribution
Gymnopilus lepidotus grows on gum logs in Florida, in July.

Phylogeny
This species is in the lepidotus-subearlei grouping.

See also

List of Gymnopilus species

References

lepidotus
Fungi of North America
Fungi described in 1969
Taxa named by Lexemuel Ray Hesler